Leopoldo Rafael Jiménez  (born May 22, 1978 in Caracas) is a Venezuelan football midfielder.

Career
Jiménez played club football for a number of professional clubs in both Venezuela and abroad, including Once Caldas in Colombia, Córdoba CF in Spain, FC Alania Vladikavkaz in Russia, Aris Limassol in Cyprus, for Deportivo Chacao in Venezuela where he spent his best years and made honors to be chosen to the Venezuela National Team, and lately in Carabobo FC from Valencia, Venezuela.

International career
He also played 64 times for the Venezuela national team.

References

External links 
 International statistics at rsssf
 
 Official website

1978 births
Living people
Footballers from Caracas
Association football midfielders
Venezuelan footballers
Venezuela international footballers
1999 Copa América players
2001 Copa América players
2004 Copa América players
Cypriot First Division players
Deportivo Italia players
UA Maracaibo players
Once Caldas footballers
Córdoba CF players
FC Spartak Vladikavkaz players
Deportivo Táchira F.C. players
Aris Limassol FC players
Estudiantes de Mérida players
Carabobo F.C. players
Deportivo Anzoátegui players
Venezuelan Primera División players
Categoría Primera A players
Russian Premier League players
Venezuelan expatriate footballers
Expatriate footballers in Colombia
Expatriate footballers in Spain
Expatriate footballers in Russia
Expatriate footballers in Cyprus
Venezuelan expatriate sportspeople in Russia
Venezuelan expatriate sportspeople in Spain
Venezuelan expatriate sportspeople in Colombia
Venezuelan expatriate sportspeople in Cyprus